Aldermaston Lock is a lock on the Kennet and Avon Canal, at Aldermaston Wharf in the English county of Berkshire. It stands at the junction of the civil parishes of Padworth, Beenham and Aldermaston.

Aldermaston Lock was built between 1718 and 1723 under the supervision of the engineer John Hore of Newbury. It was originally turf-sided, but enlarged in the mid-eighteenth century and given scalloped brick walls. It was altered in 1984 when the walls were raised to the full height of lock as part of its restoration. The original height of the scalloped walls is marked by a line of blue bricks.

It was originally called Brewhouse Lock because Strange's Brewery stood beside it.

Along with the length of the canal, the lock is the responsibility of the Canal & River Trust.

It is a grade II listed building. Below the lock is Aldermaston Lift Bridge and Aldermaston Wharf, where the Kennet and Avon Canal Trust operate a tea room.

See also

Locks on the Kennet and Avon Canal

References

External links

Aldermaston Lock on www.tonycanalpics.co.uk

Grade II listed buildings in Berkshire
Locks on the Kennet and Avon Canal
Locks of Berkshire
West Berkshire District
Grade II listed canals
Scheduled monuments in Berkshire